The 1934 Western State Teachers Hilltoppers football team was an American football team that represented Western State Teachers College (later renamed Western Michigan University) as an independent during the 1934 college football season.  In their sixth season under head coach Mike Gary, the Hilltoppers compiled a 7–1 record and outscored their opponents, 104 to 52. Halfback John Miller was the team captain.

Schedule

References

Western State Teachers
Western Michigan Broncos football seasons
Western State Teachers Hilltoppers football